A Mesmerian Experiment  is a 1905 French short silent film by Georges Méliès. It was sold by Méliès's Star Film Company and is numbered 693–695 in its catalogues.

Méliès appears in the film Doctor Mesmer. The film has few illusions, and is mainly a vehicle for its troupe of dancers, identified in Méliès's American film catalogue as the "Snow-drops" of London's Alhambra Theatre of Variety. The film's technical effects were carried out with pyrotechnics and substitution splices.

References

External links
 

1905 films
French black-and-white films
Films directed by Georges Méliès
French silent short films